Calamita is a surname. Notable people with the surname include:

Francisco Calamita (1922–2007), Spanish swimmer
Marco Calamita (born 1983), Italian footballer and manager